"El Último Romántico" is a single by Salvadoran singer Álvaro Torres released on 1997 through EMI Latin as part of Torres' fifteenth studio album El Último Romántico. The song was written by Torres, produced by himself and Nelson Gonzalez and recorded in four different studios.

"El Último Romántico" was Torres' last international hit, peaking at number 12 in May 1998 on the Billboard Hot Latin Tracks chart.

Track listing

Personnel 
Credits adapted from El Último Romántico liner notes.

Vocals

 Álvaro Torres – lead vocals
Kenny O'Brien – backing vocals
Maria del Rey – backing vocals
Cleto Escobedo – backing vocals
Carlos Murguía – backing vocals
Gisa Vatcky – backing vocals

Musicians

 César Benítez – arrangements, keyboards
George Doering – electric guitar, acoustic guitar
Pedro Eustache – flute
Enrique Martinez – accordion
Jorge Moraga – string section
Ramón Stagnaro – acoustic guitar
Michael Thompson – electric guitar
Roberto Vally – bass
Carlos Yega – drums
Ramon Yslas – percussion

Production

 Álvaro Torres – production
Nelson Gonzalez – production, coordination
Benny Faccone – mixing, engineering
César Benítez – programming
Dale Lawton – engineering assistance, mixing assistance
Jonathan Burtner – engineering assistance, mixing assistance
Jordan d'Alessio – engineering assistance, mixing assistance
Rich Veltrop – engineering assistance, mixing assistance
Cristina Abaroa – production coordination

Recording

 Recorded in House Of Blues, Encino, CA; Mad Hatter, Los Angeles, CA; Sound About, Van Nuys, CA; Westlake Studios, Hollywood, CA.

Charts

References

External links
 Lyrics of this song at Musixmatch

1997 singles
Álvaro Torres songs